Ewing is a section of Ewing Township in Mercer County, New Jersey, United States. Located at the intersection of Upper Ferry Road and Scotch Road, it is one of the oldest settlements in Ewing Township and dates back to the 18th century. The community was known as Carleton before adopting its current name.

References

Neighborhoods in Ewing Township, New Jersey
Unincorporated communities in Mercer County, New Jersey
Unincorporated communities in New Jersey